Silver High School is a high school in Silver City, New Mexico. The school was opened in its current location in 1967. It was previously known as Western High School and was part of Western New Mexico University.

History
In 1949, New Mexico State Teachers College became New Mexico Western College. At the same time, the name of the high school was changed to Western High. In 1960, the school became under the authority of the Silver City Board of Education. At that time, the school's name was changed from Western High School to Silver High School.

Construction
In 1966, the present high school building was opened on 32nd street and Silver streets.

The dedication for the new building was held on Sunday, October 29, 1967, at 2:30 p.m., where Superintendent John H. Gaines presided. The school's construction had ended the summer before. At the time, the present enrollment of Silver High was 568 for the 10th, 11th and 12th grades, which was a 15% increase from the year before. The new high school started with 28 teachers plus administrative and maintenance staff.

Current Administration
Principal - Shane Coker
Assistant Principal -Claudia Smith
Assistant Principal and Athletic Director - Gary Allison

Athletics
Silver High School has historically been a 4A division school in the New Mexico Activities Association (the state agency responsible for managing high school athletics in New Mexico), but for the 2010-11 school year, SHS was reduced to a 3A rating. Divisions are based on school enrollment and determine which other high schools, in the relevant geographical district, the school competes with.

Softball (Current 7x in a row State Champions)
Football
Baseball
Wrestling
Boys Basketball
Girls Basketball
Volleyball
Track
Cheerleading
Cross Country
Golf
Girls Soccer
Boys Soccer
Tennis

Other
Drama
Choir
Marching Band
Concert Band
Jazz Band
Key Club
Chess Club
Student Council
FCCLA
FFA
Dance [Varsity and JV]
National Honor Society
Science Olympiad
Mathematics
National History Day

References

External links

Schools in Grant County, New Mexico
Public high schools in New Mexico
Educational institutions established in 1960
1960 establishments in New Mexico